Calycogonium (common name, angleflower) is a polyphyletic genus of about forty species in the family Melastomataceae, native to the Caribbean, particularly Hispaniola, Jamaica, and Cuba. The genus is a member of a clade characterized by calyptra on flower buds, few hairs, and the presence of mite domatia on the underside of the leaves.

Species
Calycogonium bairdianum
Calycogonium bissei
Calycogonium calycopteris
Calycogonium glabratum
Calycogonium impressum
Calycogonium pseudofloribundum
Calycogonium rhamnoideum
Calycogonium rhomboideum
Calycogonium torbecianum

References

Melastomataceae genera
Melastomataceae